Ciofi is an Italian surname. Notable people with the surname include:

 Patrizia Ciofi (born 1967), Italian operatic coloratura soprano
 Andrea Ciofi (born 1999), Italian footballer

Italian-language surnames